The 1963 Colorado Buffaloes football team was an American football team that represented the University of Colorado in the Big Eight Conference during the 1963 NCAA University Division football season. Led by first-year head coach Eddie Crowder, the Buffaloes compiled an overall record of 2–8  with a mark of 2–5 in conference play, placing sixth in the Big 8. The Buffaloes played their home games on campus at Folsom Field in Boulder, Colorado.

Crowder, previously an assistant coach at Oklahoma (and a former Sooner quarterback), was hired at age 31 in early January, with a five-year contract at $15,000 per year.

Schedule

References

Colorado
Colorado Buffaloes football seasons
Colorado Buffaloes football